Lin Shan may refer to:

Lin Shan (goalball) (born 1986), Chinese goalball player
Lin Shan (diver) (born 2001), Chinese diver
Ashley Lin (born 2003), American-Chinese figure skater